Rohtak is a city and the administrative headquarters of the Rohtak district in the Indian state of Haryana. Rohtak forms a part of the National Capital Region (NCR) which helps the city in obtaining cheap loans for infrastructure development from the NCR Planning Board.

Rohtak is the sixth most populous city in Haryana as per the 2011 census with a population of 374,292.

History 

Clay mounds of coins discovered at Khokhrakot have thrown light on the process of casting coins in ancient India. The coin moulds of the later Yaudheyas of the 3rd or 4th century AD have been discovered in large number here, along with several clay seals of the same and subsequent dates. A Gupta terracotta plaque and a head of later date have also been discovered. 

Vipakasutra mentions popularity of Jain deity Parshvanatha and his protector Dharanendra in Rohtak around ninth century AD. A seventh century AD statue of Parshvanatha, twenty-third Jain tirthankara, was found in the Asthal Bohar village.

The town continued to flourish till the 10th century AD, as coins of King Samanta Deva of the Hindu Shahi have been found here. The town was conquered by the Ghaznavids under Mahmud of Ghazni between 1020-1030.

Rohtak is listed in the Ain-i-Akbari as a Mughal pargana under Delhi sarkar, producing a revenue of 8,599,270 dams for the imperial treasury and supplying a force of 2000 infantry and 100 cavalry. The existence of a brick fort was also noted. It is also mentioned in Vipakasutra, one of twelve ancient texts of Svetambara Jainism, written around ninth century AD, as a kingdom of kings Vesamanadatta and Pusyanandi. Later, Chahamanas ruled in the city region.

Geography 
Rohtak lies 70 kilometres (43 mi) north-west of New Delhi and 250 kilometres (160 mi) south of the state capital Chandigarh on NH 9(old NH 10). Rohtak forms a part of the National Capital Region.

Climate 
Rohtak's climate shows extreme variation in temperature. It does not usually fall below freezing point in the winter months from November to February.

Rainfall 
Annual rainfall of the district is about 58 cm. The rainfall is unevenly distributed and decreases from south east to south west. The rainy season is from July to September. About 80% of the total rainfall is received during this period. Some rainfall is received from western disturbances during the winter season. Due to the low rainfall and its short duration, agricultural activities are mostly dependent upon canal irrigation and tubewells.

Hydrology 
The development of the area largely depends over the quality as well as quantity of ground water. As far as Rohtak District is concerned ground water occurs in semi-confined to unconfined aquifers. The unconfined aquifers are tapped by dugwells. While the semi-confined aquifers are tapped by shallow tubewells which are 22,000 in number.

Demographics 

Rohtak is the sixth most populous city in the state of Haryana with a population of 373,133  provisional 2011 census figures. The population in 2001 was 294,577, and the population growth rate during 2001-2011 was 26.7%.

The city had a sex ratio of 946 females per 1,000 males and 10.9% of the population were under six years old.  Effective literacy was 84.08%; male literacy was 88.94% and female literacy was 78.68%.

Religion 

According to the 2011 Census of India, most of the inhabitants of the city are followers of Hinduism, with a substantial Jain, Muslim and Sikh population.

City

Tehsil

Government and politics
There is a mini Secretariat in the city, located near the court.

Infrastructure 
The Haryana Government has asked the Union Government to declare Haryana Sub-Region (HSR) a zone of strategic national interest. HSR consists of 35 urban centres, including Gurgaon, Faridabad, Panipat, Sonepat and Rohtak. The growth rate of urban population in the zone has been above 60 per cent, the highest among all the constituents of National Capital Region. These urban centres face a rapid growth in population as the workforce travels to work from here to the Capital.

Sectors 

In Rohtak old sectors are Sector 1, Sector 3, Sector 14, Sector 2, 4 are newly developed and new sectors 4 ext. 5, 6, 25 are being planned. Model Town, Patel Nagar, DLF Colony, Sector 1 and 14 are considered to be upmarket areas of the city. Entrance of Sector-14 is opposite to Gate number 2 of Maharshi Dayanand University. D-Park, Model Town comprises all branded showrooms and one of the best  places to hangout in the city. Sectors 26 and 28 are relatively new. They are a part of Real Estate Giant Omaxe City's Residence Projects.

Smart City contender
Chief Minister Manohar Lal Khattar's hometown, Karnal, tops the cities shortlisted by the screening committee for the ‘smart city’ tag at a meeting.
Faridabad was placed second while Gurgaon, Rohtak and Hisar could seize only the third spot. The Department of Urban Local Bodies asked for recommendations for smart city contenders from all municipal bodies.

Rohtak's Ex Mayor Renu Dabla (presently Manmohan Goyal) has stated that the process adopted for the selection of Haryana districts for the Smart City project was biased and based on political considerations.

Facilities

The Municipal Corporation has prepared a strategy for future developments, that includes new residential areas, healthy environment, and maintained roads. Manohar Lal Khattar, the Haryana CM, formally launched the country's first railway elevated track project on 17 March 2018. The ambitious, 6-km track, costing around Rs 316 crore, is set to come up on the Rohtak-Panipat line in 18 months, and the existing railway track will be replaced by a road, which will be built at the cost of Rs 8 crore.

Healthcare 
The city hosts the Pandit Bhagwat Dayal Sharma Post Graduate Institute of Medical Sciences and Civil Hospital, both of which are operated by the state government. There are also various privately operated medical facilities.
Pt B.D.Sharma, PGIMS, Rohtak has situated at a distance of about 240  km from Chandigarh and about 70  km from Delhi on Delhi-Hissar-Sirsa-Fazilka National Highway (NH-10). It is the only major Institution for Medical Education and Research and a tertiary care centre for provision of specialised health care services not only to the people of the State of Haryana, but also to those from Punjab, Rajasthan, Delhi and western U.P.  The Institute was started under the name of Medical College, Rohtak in the year 1960.  For the first three years, the students were admitted to Medical College, Patiala which acted as a host Institution.  In 1963, the students were shifted to Rohtak.  In the subsequent years, multifaceted expansion measures have transformed the Institute into a fully developed centre of Medical Education and research in all the major disciplines of Medicine.  In the year 1994, Medical College, Rohtak was renamed as Pt. B.D.Sharma, Medical College, Rohtak and subsequently, it was upgraded to a Post Graduate Institute of Medical Sciences in the year 1995.  Today Pt. B.D.Sharma, PGIMS, Rohtak is a famous institution not only for medical education but also for the healthcare facilities both at the National as well as International level.

The institute has a remarkably well-developed campus spread over an area of 350 acres of land. During the 50 years of its existence, Pt. B.D.Sharma, PGIMS, Rohtak has witnessed a phenomenal growth achieving not only its designated goals but also in expanding its horizons to set newer objectives completely commensurable with the requirements of the National goal of “Health for all by 2020”.

Sewerage 
In NCR, out of 108 towns only 33 towns have sewerage system and even in these 33 towns, the coverage can at best be classified as partial. The network coverage in some of the important cities in NCR includes NCT Delhi, Meerut, Ghaziabad, Noida, Faridabad, Panipat, Gurgaon, Rohtak, Sonepat and Alwar where Rohtak was completed 65% in 2001 and 90% in 2011 according to an official report.

Political controversy
The development of Rohtak caused controversy in 2013 as a result of the allegedly disproportionate number of state development projects that have been awarded to the city by Chief Minister Bhupinder Singh Hooda, who was born in a nearby village. This has led to severe criticism by both the opposition parties and some members of the governing Indian National Congress party, who have attacked Hooda for bias. Rao Inderjit Singh, a BJP leader from South Haryana, used Right to Information requests to determine that from a total of 5,135 announcements of schemes in the state, 2,045 went to the three districts of Rohtak, Jhajjar and Sonepat. These areas were in Hooda's own constituency and that of his son, the Lok Sabha MP Deepeder Singh Hooda. Of the 3,356 completed schemes, 1,560 were from these three districts whereas 1,796 schemes were completed in the rest of the state. Ambala MP Selja Kumari is also against the region-specific and biased development of Rohtak.

The Haryana Urban Development Authority has spent over Rs 3.4 billion on the development of Rohtak. Until 31 December 2010 collected Rs 3.22 billion as external development charges in Rohtak and spent almost Rs 6.63 billion of the fund.

However, the most developed cities of the state based expenditure on infrastructure over the last 15 years are Gurgaon, Faridabad, Hisar, Panchkula, Panipat and Ambala.

Economy

Industrial areas and townships 
As of 2018, Haryana State Industrial and Infrastructure Development Corporation (HSIIDC) has developed an Industrial Model Township (IMT). MNCs like Maruti Suzuki, Asian Paints, Suzuki Motorcycle, Nippon Carbide, Amul, Lakshmi Precision Screws and Aisin Automotive launched work on projects.

Maruti research and development plant 
Maruti is developing a mega research and development facility at Rohtak. The progress as R C Bhargava, non-executive chairman of Maruti Suzuki India, says
"We will be able to do research and development and testing comparable to anything Japan has. We used to send all our models to Japan for testing; all that can be done here. There will be saving of time and money."

Culture 
A very old and antique heritage has been preserved in Rohtak. Baba Mast Nath Math, Gokaran, kiloi temple, and several more such fine looking buildings erected in traditional Indian and Mughal styles such as spacious havelis with ornate facade, finely carved wooden door sets and sandstone pillars, mosques that were once lavishly decorated in stucco work, dharamshalas with fine looking statues of Radha and Krishna and temple spires and are few of them. The survey was extended to study a few large village estates such as Balambha, Farmana Khas, Lakhan Majra, jassia, Bhaini Surjan and Meham by Society for Peoples’ Advancement, Technology and Heritage (SOPATH). The present Monastery was founded by Baba Mast Nath in 1731.

 Medieval Times
A centuries-old fort was situated at Rohtak, in present-day Qilla Mohallah. That fort was built by Sheikhs of Yemen under Qazi Sultan Muhammad Surkh Zulqarni during Ghauri Dynasty kings . The then Delhi emperor Mahmud Tughlaq posted two brothers, Malik Idrees and Mubariz Khan at that fort in 1400. The fort of Rohtak was besieged by Syed Khizer Khan in 1410 which could only succeed after a long seizure lasting six months.

 British period (1800-1947)
Rohtak is among the oldest organised districts of Haryana; the British officers used to reside here since 1810. Those British constructed a Church at Rohtak, which was completed in 1867. It was named as All Saints Church. Its central hall was built by Maj. Feindala in the memory of his daughter Athel Nora, while the contribution for woodwork was given by JF Bruster and RF Kalenal.
There are some tombstones, having dated inscriptions in the graveyard near mini secretariat building of Rohtak. Previously it was said to be surrounded by a garden, but now only a narrow strip of land is left for this cemetery. It has some 180-year-old historic tombstones, including one identified to be that of DC Moore. This centuries old cemetery is currently in a deserted condition and a thick thorny vegetation growth has covered the tombs stones there.

Transportation

Roads 
Rohtak is connected to seven cities by three national highways NH 9, NH 709, NH 352 (old NH 10, NH71, and NH71A) and two State Highways (SH16 and SH18).
National Highway 9 from New Delhi to Rohtak is upgraded to six lanes with 30 km Rohtak City Bypass, so that the vehicles travelling between New Delhi and Hisar do not have to enter Rohtak city. National Highway 9 from Rohtak to Hissar and several cities of Punjab is being widened to a four-lane highway.

National highway 
Three National Highways, NH-9 (Malaut, Punjab to Askot in Uttarakhand), NH-709 (Rajgarh, Haryana to Panipat, Haryana) and NH-352 (Narwana to Rewari) pass through the city. Rohtak is connected to Delhi through NH-9, and currently the road is being widened to six lanes by NHAI, with the plans to develop the entire corridor as an industrial area. NH-352 From Rewari to Rohtak is 4 lanes, and NH-709 from Rohtak to Panipat is 4 lanes.

Railway 

Rohtak City has a railway junction with connections to Delhi, Panipat, Rewari, Bhiwani and Jind converging on the city. Rohtak is connected to Bahadurgarh through Delhi line, to Gohana through Panipat line and Jhajjar through Rewari line. Delhi and Jind connections are part of the Delhi-Fazilka line, and the line is double tracked from Delhi to Bhatinda, Punjab, India, and is electrified between Delhi and Bhatinda. All other lines are single track and electrified i.e. Rohtak Rewari Line, Rohtak Hisar Line (via Bhiwani).

Rohtak Junction railway station is served by three Shatabdi Express services (New Delhi Moga Shatabdi Express, New Delhi–Firozpur Shatabdi Express and New Delhi Ludhiana Shatabdi Express) and Ajmer Chandigarh Garib Rath Express.

The railway track between New Delhi and Rohtak has been electrified. EMU services has been running between the two cities since March 2013.

Air travel 
There is currently no commercial airport serving the city. The state govt has shown interests in building a Greenfield Cargos Airport at the Meham town to serve this city and the AAI has given consent in principle for this. The nearest International Airport is Indira Gandhi International Airport at Delhi approx.75 km.

Education 

 Indian Institute of Management Rohtak is amongst the top management institutes in India and is positioned as analytics hub in India.
 Indian Institute of Technology Delhi extension campus also being set up with a budget of Rs 50 crore.
 Pandit Bhagwat Dayal Sharma Post Graduate Institute of Medical Sciences is a government medical institution established in 1960. As of 2009, it was proposed to be upgraded to the level of AIIMS.
 State Institute of Film and Television, a film school under the State University of Performing And Visual Arts, established in 2011.

List of universities in Rohtak 
 Baba Mast Nath University, private university established in 2012
 Maharishi Dayanand University, established in 1976 and named after the saint Dayananda Saraswati

Media and communications 
All India Radio has a local station in Rohtak which transmits various programs of mass interest.

Sport 
The Haryana Urban Development Authority (HUDA) has developed the Rajiv Gandhi Sports Complex in Sector-6 which was completed in 2012. The complex includes cricket, hockey and football facilities, tennis courts, an athletics stadium, wrestling hall, swimming pools and other leisure facilities. An athletic pavilion has also been constructed at the sports complex. The pavilion has a height of 100 feet and it has a capacity to accommodate 8000 spectators. A synthetic track has also been constructed in front of the pavilion for warming up of athletes. Apart from this, three earthen mounts have been developed on international standard and these would provide seating capacity for 22,000 spectators.  Therefore, in all, a total of 30,000 spectators would be able to view the sports activities in this sports complex.

Chaudhary Bansi Lal Cricket Stadium is a cricket ground in the Lahli, Rohtak (Haryana). The Stadium can accommodate only 8,000 spectators. The ground came into the limelight when Sachin Tendulkar played his last Ranji match in October 2013

Notable individuals

 Brigadier James Michael Calvert, British Army officer who was involved in special operations in Burma during the Second World War was born in Rohtak in 1913.
 Rafi Muhammad Chaudhary, most prominent nuclear scientist from Indian sub continent AMU Alumni, Rutherford's PhD student and Pakistani scientist
 Manushi Chhillar, Miss World 2017, model and actress
 Manish Grover, MLA and politician
 Abdul Hafiz (VC) was the youngest Indian Victoria Cross holder, he came from Kalanaur village, Rohtak 
 Bhupinder Singh Hooda, former Chief Minister of Haryana
 Deepender Singh Hooda,  politician
 Randeep Hooda, Bollywood actor
 Sakshi Malik, Bronze Medalist - Women's 58 kg Freestyle Wrestling at 2016 Rio Summer Olympics
 Amit Panghal, Asian Games Gold Medalist in Light Flyweight Men's Boxing
 Chhotu Ram, most prominent pre-partition politicians in Punjab, co-founder of the National Unionist Party
 Karambir Singh, 24th Chief of the Naval Staff (CNS) of the Indian Navy.
 Paramvir Singh, During his 38 years service as WildLife Inspector set and broke his own records of Wild animal articles' seizure from poachers. Resultantly he was instrumental in wiping out illegal trade of Wild animals and their derivatives from NCT of Delhi. Lt. Governor, Delhi felicitated and commended his efforts vide letter Dt. 26 April 1988

See also 
 Bahadurgarh
 Gurgaon
 Faridabad
 Sonepat
 Moradabad
 Jind
 Gohana
 Bhiwani

References

Notes

Citations

Sources

External links 

 Rohtak official website
 Haryana Urban Development Authority 
 Government Technical Institution 
 Rohtak

 
Smart cities in India